Stephen Austin is an Australian Paralympic archery silver medalist.

He won a silver medal in the Men's Short Metric Round Team 1A-6. He finished 8th in the Men's Double Advanced Metric Round Paraplegic.

References 

Paralympic archers of Australia
Archers at the 1984 Summer Paralympics
Paralympic silver medalists for Australia
Living people
Australian male archers
Year of birth missing (living people)
Medalists at the 1984 Summer Paralympics
Paralympic medalists in archery